To Kill a Dragon is a 1988 Soviet-German parable fantasy film based on the play of Evgeny Schwartz Dragon (1942–1944), directed by Mark Zakharov (marking his final film until 2002).

Plot
A wandering knight Lancelot, a distant descendant on the maternal side of the famous Sir Lancelot, comes to a city which has been ruled by a fierce dragon for four hundred years. Most of the residents do not want to be rescued from the tyranny of the monstrous serpent, explaining its historical importance.

Lancelot, saving the Dragon's victim, an innocent girl, challenges the monster to a fight. In the underground city there are people who help the knight to find weapons and get ready for an unequal fight. Lancelot defeats the Dragon, but he gets wounded and goes into hiding. In the city the dragon's rule is replaced by chaos.

Gradually, the bygone story becomes the past, and the city is getting new decrees. After the fight with the Dragon, the city mayor who at his rule served as a puppet claims victory over the Dragon. Lancelot is forced to return to the city to explain to the residents that in itself the death of the Dragon only means that it is time for each kill a dragon in themselves and that he will make all residents to do so. However, as he does so, the inhabitants of the town come to see him as the next dragon and bow before their new master.

Lancelot goes away from the people. He sees children playing with the Dragon who has shapeshifted from a dark and cynical warlord to a good-natured bearded man. The Dragon offers not to continue battling with the children present but Lancelot refuses. The Dragon declares that the most interesting bit is about to begin. Lancelot, the Dragon and the children leave.

Cast 
Aleksandr Abdulov - Lancelot
Oleg Yankovsky - The Dragon
Yevgeny Leonov - Burgermeister
Vyacheslav Tikhonov - Charlemagne
Alexandra Zakharova - Elsa (singing voice by Larisa Dolina)
Viktor Rakov - Heinrich, Burgermeister's son
Aleksandr Zbruyev - Friedrichsen
Semyon Farada - Conductor
Aleksandr Filippenko - Blacksmith-gunsmith
Andrei Tolubeyev - Hatter
Slava Polunin - Balloonist

Awards
In 1990 the film won the Nika Award in two nominations:
Costume Designer (Natalya Moneva)
 Music for the film (Gennady Gladkov)

References

External links 

1988 films
Soviet fantasy films
West German films
Mosfilm films
Russian fantasy films
Films based on works by Evgeny Shvarts
Films directed by Mark Zakharov
Films scored by Gennady Gladkov